Peperomia valliculae is a species of epiphyte and herb from the genus 'Peperomia'. Peperomia valliculae can mostly be found in Central America. It primarily grows in wet tropical biomes.

Etymology

In Latin, Vallicula means valley. This refers to the type locality, Cerro Valle Chiquito, Panama.

Distribution
Peperomia valliculae can be found in Panama, El Salvador, Guatemala, and Mexico. Specimens can be found at an altitude of 700–1100 meters.

Panama
Coclé Province
Cerro Valle Chiquito
Anton Valley
Colón
El Salvador
Ahuachapán
Santa Ana
Guatemala
San Marcos
Mexico
Guerrero

Description
Its a rather large, assurgent herb; with stems 3-5 millimeters thick below, when dry, it ascends to 30 cm. leaves alternate or sometimes 2 or 3 at a node. The leaves that alternate are diamond-shaped and wide near the tip, has a blunt growing point, slightly indented, and have a triangular leaf base, which is 1–2 cm. It is glabrous; round bract stem, having dotted teeth with glands; fruit ovoid, about 0.5 millimeters. long, rather obscurely palmately 3-nerved, are glabrous on both side, cilio-late toward the apex, dark-glandular-dotted, it has a drying firm and it is opaque, Its petioles are 5-10 millimeters long, grooved above. Spikes that are terminal and axillary are 1 millimeter thick and 10-18 centimeters long. Its peduncles are 1-2 centimeters long.

References

valliculae
Flora of Central America
Flora of North America
Flora of Panama
Flora of El Salvador
Flora of Guatemala
Flora of Mexico
Plants described in 1935
Taxa named by William Trelease